The Sapura Hockey Club are the Malaysia Hockey League (MHL) team from Kuala Lumpur, Malaysia.

The best seasons for Sapura team were 2004 & 2005, both seasons they won the double.

Players

First team

Notable players
   Kang Keong-Wook - 2005
   Hwang Jong-Hyun - 2005
   Rehan Butt - 2010
   David James Kettle - 2010
   Lim Woo-Geun - 2010

Club officials

Coaching and medical staff

 Manager:  Abdullah Yunus
 Chief coach:  I. Vikneswaran

Chief coach history

Honours
 Malaysia Hockey League titles         
 Winners (2): 2004, 2005
 MHL-TNB Cup/Overall champions  
 Winners (2):  2005, 2006

See also
 Malaysia Hockey League

Malaysian field hockey clubs
Field hockey clubs established in 1987
1987 establishments in Malaysia
Sport in Kuala Lumpur